Steroid Receptor Associated and Regulated Protein (SRARP) in humans is a protein encoded by a gene of the same name with two exons that is located on chromosome 1p36.13. SRARP contains 169 amino acids and has a molecular weight of 17,657 Da.

Expression and function in breast cancer 
SRARP is co-expressed with the estrogen receptor (ER) and androgen receptor (AR) in breast cancer. In the ER-positive breast cancer cells, SRARP is involved in the transcriptional activities of ER and has shown an interaction with ER using the transient transfection of cells with SRARP and ER constructs. In addition, in AR+ breast cancer cells, SRARP interacts with the endogenous AR protein and acts as a transcriptional corepressor of AR. Furthermore, the activation of either AR or ER negatively regulates SRARP expression in breast cancer cells.

Tumor suppressor function in malignancies 
SRARP and HSPB7 are gene pairs that are positioned 5 kb apart on chromosome 1p36.13. It is notable that the loss of chromosome 1p36.1 is common in malignancies, occurring in 34% of tumors SRARP and HSPB7 are broadly inactivated in malignancies by epigenetic silencing, copy-number loss, and less frequently by somatic mutations. In addition, overexpression of SRARP or HSPB7 leads to tumor suppressor effects in cancer cell lines. Another similar molecular feature between SRARP and HSPB7 is the fact that both of these proteins interact with the 14-3-3 protein. Furthermore, SRARP is a potential cancer biomarker and SRARP inactivation predicts poor clinical outcome in malignancies and adjacent normal tissues using the analysis of large genomic datasets

References 

Proteins